Padula, La Padula, or Lapadula is a surname. Notable people with the surname include:

Andrea Padula (born 1996), Swiss footballer
Edward Padula (1916–2001), American theatre producer
Gianluca Lapadula (born 1990), Peruvian footballer
Gino Padula (born 1976), Argentine footballer
Guillermo Padula (born 1997), Uruguayan footballer
Leonard J. LaPadula, American computer security researcher, namesake of the Bell–LaPadula model
Livio La Padula (born 1985), Italian rower
Marc Lapadula, American playwright, screenwriter, and academic
Mariolina Padula (died 2012), Italian mathematical physicist
Mary L. Padula, American politician
Oscar Padula Castro (born 1993), Uraguayan footballer
Vicente Padula (1898–1967), Argentine film actor